Grazia Maria Pinto (born Catania, 22 April 1988) is an Italian model. She was crowned Miss Universe Italy 2012 on 31 August 2012 at the Rainbow MagicLand Theme Park in Rome. She is 1.77 m tall (5'9.5"). By winning the title, Grazia Maria earned the right to represent her country at the Miss Universe 2012 pageant.

As part of her prize package, Grazia Maria won a week-long stay in Panama, from 15 to 22 October, to attend the prestigious Katty Pulido International Academy, where she received intensive training in all areas of competition to aid her preparation for the Miss Universe pageant.

Notes

External links 

Sito ufficiale di Miss Universo Italia

1988 births
Living people
Italian female models
Miss Universe 2012 contestants
Italian beauty pageant winners